Maéva Jocelyne Clemaron (born 10 November 1992) is a French professional footballer who plays as a midfielder for Swiss Women's Super League club Servette.

Clemaron has previously played in France with Saint-Étienne and Fleury. She was part of the France national team at the 2019 FIFA Women's World Cup.

Career statistics

International

Scores and results list France's goal tally first. Score column indicates score after each Clemaron goal.

References

External links
 
 Maéva Clemaron at footofeminin.fr 
 
 
 Maeva Clémaron : « La Coupe du monde en ligne de mire », lessor42.fr

1992 births
Living people
Women's association football midfielders
French women's footballers
France women's youth international footballers
France women's international footballers
Division 1 Féminine players
Women's Super League players
AS Saint-Étienne (women) players
FC Fleury 91 (women) players
Everton F.C. (women) players
Tottenham Hotspur F.C. Women players
2019 FIFA Women's World Cup players
French expatriate sportspeople in England
Expatriate women's footballers in England
Sportspeople from Vienne, Isère
Footballers from Auvergne-Rhône-Alpes
French expatriate women's footballers
Expatriate women's footballers in Switzerland
French expatriate sportspeople in Switzerland
Servette FC Chênois Féminin players